Dr. Afif bin Bahardin (born 13 May 1985) is a Malaysian politician who has served as Member of the Penang State Legislative Assembly (MLA) for Seberang Jaya from May 2013 until March 2023 . He served as Member of the Penang State Executive Council (EXCO) in the Pakatan Rakyat (PR) and PH state administrations under Chief Ministers Lim Guan Eng and Chow Kon Yeow from May 2013 to his resignation in March 2020. He is a member of the Malaysian United Indigenous Party (BERSATU), a component party of the Perikatan Nasional (PN) coalition and was a member of the People's Justice Party (PKR), a component party of the Pakatan Harapan (PH) coalition. He was Deputy Youth Chief of PKR and Deputy Division Chief of the Permatang Pauh of PKR.

Personal background
He grew up in Shah Alam, Selangor. He received his secondary education at Maktab Rendah Sains MARA Lenggong/Chenderoh in Perak and had his university education at Universiti Teknologi MARA (UiTM), graduated with a bachelor's degree in medicine and surgery.

After leaving university, Afif worked as medical officer at the Seberang Jaya Hospital and Sungai Buloh Hospital. In October 2010, Afif married Mardhiah Zakaria. The couple have two children.

Political career

Election to the Penang State Legislative Assembly
In 2013, Afif was nominated by People's Justice Party (PKR) to contest the Seberang Jaya state seat in Penang for the 2013 Malaysian general election. On the polling day, Afif won by a majority of 2,459 votes, defeating Mohammad Nasir Abdullah from the then-ruling Barisan Nasional (BN) coalition and an independent candidate, Shamsut Tabrej GM Ismail Maricar.

On 9 May 2013, Afif was appointed as the State Executive Councillor in charge of agriculture, agro-based industries, rural development and health replacing Law Choo Kiang who had been appointed as the new Speaker of the Penang State Legislative Assembly.

People's Justice Party (PKR)
In the People's Justice Party (PKR) party elections in 2014, Afif was elected as the deputy chief of the youth wing succeeding Khairul Anuar Ahmad Zainuddin.

During the 2018 PKR party elections, Afif contested the PKR Angkatan Muda Keadilan Youth Chief post but was defeated by Rafizi Ramli loyalist youth chief candidate Akmal Nasir.

On 24 June 2020, he announced his departure from the People's Justice Party (PKR) for joining forces with the state opposition party Malaysian United Indigenous Party (BERSATU), which is in the Perikatan Nasional (PN) coalition.

Election results

References

Living people
Malaysian medical doctors
1985 births
Malaysian people of Malay descent
Malaysian Muslims
Former People's Justice Party (Malaysia) politicians
Malaysian United Indigenous Party politicians
People from Selangor
Members of the Penang State Legislative Assembly
Penang state executive councillors